George Roy Harvey (June 15, 1869 – May 11, 1935) was an American football coach.  He served as the head football coach at Auburn University for four games in the fall of 1893, compiling a record of 2–0–2.  D. M. Balliet had coached one game for Auburn earlier that year, in February. He was an alumnus of Cornell University.

Head coaching record

Notes

References

External links
 

1869 births
1935 deaths
19th-century players of American football
American football fullbacks
Auburn Tigers football coaches
Cornell Big Red football players
Sportspeople from Hamilton, Ontario
Canadian players of American football